Randy Stoklos (born December 13, 1960) is a retired professional beach volleyball player. He is the first player to earn $1,000,000 playing competitive beach volleyball. He won one U.S. championship and Five World championships with Sinjin Smith. He is a four-time winner of the Manhattan Beach Open.

Stoklos played college volleyball at UCLA. He left UCLA early to focus on beach volleyball. He won his first Manhattan Open teaming with Jim Menges in 1981. Stoklos has 123 career wins (which ranks Stoklos third of all-time), amassed almost two million dollars in prize money and received numerous MVP and Best Setter awards.  In 1992, he reflected on his father's unwillingness to allow him to play volleyball at the beach. His father was a Pole who survived a German work camp noted in the LA Times as a "harsh old-country type" who was afraid his son would grow up to be lazy if he spent too much time at the beach.

Stoklos was inducted into the Volleyball Hall of Fame on October 23, 2008. In 2015, he was inducted into the National Polish-American Sports Hall of Fame.

The pair of Stoklos and Sinjin Smith was featured in the video game Kings of the Beach released in 1988 for multiple computer platforms by Electronic Arts and in 1990 for the Nintendo Entertainment System by Konami, and also appeared in the 1990 film Side Out as the nemesis team of Rollo Vincent (Stoklos) and Billy Cross (Smith).

References

External links
 Profile at volleyball.org

American men's beach volleyball players
1960 births
Living people
Sportspeople from Santa Monica, California
American people of Polish descent
UCLA Bruins men's volleyball players